Manak is a residential town in the Punjab province of Pakistan. It is in Lahore District at 31°13'0N 73°12'30E with an altitude of 173 metres (570 feet). 

It is located in the Allama Iqbal Zone of Lahore District. Neighbouring settlements include Phadiara, Singh Khalsa and Ghator.

References

Populated places in Lahore District
Allama Iqbal Zone